Doryphallophoridae is a family of crustaceans belonging to the class Tantulocarida. The family was previously placed in class Hexanauplia.

Genera:
 Doryphallophora Huys, 1990
 Paradoryphallophora Ohtsuka & Boxshall, 1998

References

Crustaceans
Crustacean families